Honky Tonk is a 1929 American Pre-Code musical film starring Sophie Tucker in her film debut. The film was a flop when released and is now lost, although the Vitaphone soundtrack for the film and for the trailer still exists. Tucker sings a number of songs in the movie, including her theme song "Some of These Days", and "I'm the Last of the Red Hot Mamas", from which she took her billing as "The Last of the Red Hot Mamas".

Plot
Sophie Tucker plays Sophie Leonard, a singer in a nightclub who at great sacrifice sends her daughter Beth (Lila Lee) to Europe to be educated, keeping her work as an entertainer a secret from her. When the grown-up, expensively educated Beth returns to America, she is shocked to discover her mother's true profession and disowns her, breaking Sophie's heart.

Cast
 Sophie Tucker as Sophie Leonard
 Lila Lee as Beth, Sophie daughter
 Wilbur Mack as Stuttering valet
 Audrey Ferris as Jean Gilmore
 Tom Keene as Freddie Gilmore
 Mahlon Hamilton as Jim Blaken
 John T. Murray as Cafe manager

Reception
According to Warner Bros the film earned $448,000 domestically and $202,000 foreign.

Musical numbers
 "I'm Doing What I'm Doing for Love" (Milton Ager, Jack Yellen)
 "He's a Good Man To Have Around" (Ager, Yellen)
 "I'm Feathering a Nest (For a Little Blue Bird)" (Ager, Yellen)
 "I'm the Last of the Red Hot Mamas" (Ager, Yellen)
 "I Don't Want To Get Thin" (Ager, Yellen)
 "Some of These Days" (Shelton Brooks)

See also
List of incomplete or partially lost films

References

External links
 
 
 
 
 lobby poster, original release
 Honky Tonk Soundtrack at Internet Archive

1929 films
1920s English-language films
Lost American films
1929 musical films
Films directed by Lloyd Bacon
American musical films
American black-and-white films
1929 lost films
Lost musical films
1920s American films